The following is an incomplete list of Egyptian films of the 2000s. For an A-Z list of films currently on Wikipedia, see :Category:Egyptian films.

2000s

External links
 Egyptian film at the Internet Movie Database

2000s
Lists of 2000s films
Films